Sri Rossa Roslaina Handiyani, known simply as Rossa in Indonesia and Dato' Sri Rossa in Malaysia, is an Indonesian singer and businesswoman. Born in Sumedang, West Java, Indonesia on 9 October 1978, she is one of the most popular artists in Indonesian and Malay-speaking countries, the most expensive Indonesian singer in Malaysia and best-selling Indonesian artists of all-time based on album sales, selling over eleven million copies in the region until 2021. As an Indonesian diva, Rossa has produced numerous hit songs and gained Multi-Platinum Award & Million Award for her albums. Since 1999, her albums have been released in Southeast Asia and also Japan. Even until Rossa's songs were famous, she was once paid 150 million rupiah to sing one of her songs entitled "Sakura" and 210 million rupiah to sing one of her songs entitled "Ayat-Ayat Cinta".

SM Entertainment, Anugerah Planet Muzik, Asia Pop 40 & Indonesia Media also mentions that Rossa is the "Queen of Indonesian Pop." Meanwhile, the prominent presenter of Metro TV, Alvin Adam, mentioned in his biography "The Story Book Just Alvin Part.2" that Rossa is the "Queen of Concert in Indonesia" because there are too many requests to sing at concerts. Singer and judge for the talent show Judika also shares the same view as Alvin Adam that Rossa is the Queen of Concerts in Indonesia.

Her second compilation album, The Best of Rossa is ranked 10th on the list of Indonesian all time best selling albums with over 1.5 million copies. Her solo album Love, Life & Music also broke the Indonesian Record World Museum (MURI) and Indonesia Recording Industry Association (ASIRI) as the highest-selling Indonesian album of all time with over 100,000 copies CD sold in a day. Her songs have been used for over 155 soundtrack titles, both for films and soap operas until 2021. Rossa has won many awards with a total of more than 115 awards untiil 2021; she is one of the most awarded Indonesian artist in history.

At the beginning of 2017, Rossa launched her latest album "A New Chapter" which incorporates collaborations with international musicians such as Mitch Allan, Tushar Apte, Fiona Bevan, and others. It was awarded 4× Platinum Awards on 5 October 2017. She also received the "Planet Muzik Special Award (Category : Legend Award)" from Anugerah Planet Muzik (Regional Grammy Awards) in Singapore on 28 October 2018. The first Indonesian singer to receive a special award for this category.

In February 2019, Rossa became the first Indonesian artist and first Southeast Asian solo artist to join SM Entertainment, an International label and management group from South Korea that handles famous artists such as KANGTA, BoA, TVXQ!, Super Junior, Girls' Generation, SHINee, f(x), EXO, Red Velvet, NCT, aespa and many others.

Career

1988–2006: Gadis Ingusan – Yang Terpilih 
Rossa debuted as a singer when she was ten years old with her first album, Gadis Ingusan, in 1988. In 1990, she released her second album titled Untuk Sahabatku under the supervision of Dian Records/Pro-Sound. Following this album, Rossa took time to complete her studies before continuing her journey with music. However, her career as a child singer was not yet successful.

Rossa's career breakthrough came when she released her third studio album Nada-Nada Cinta in 1996 produced by Younky Soewarno. This album sold more than 750,000 copies, and the single "Nada-Nada Cinta" ranked second on MTV Ampuh Indonesia for 18 weeks under Indonesia's all-time MTV Chart List section. This song was also ranked 1st in the category of "Song of the Year MTV Ampuh Indonesia". In addition to being a singer, she was also an actress, starring in the soap opera entitled Dua Sisi Mata Uang.

In 1999, Rossa released her fourth album Tegar. It received Four Platinum Awards, and she won Favourite Female Artist at MTV Indonesia Award in 2000, The Potential Star Award by Bintang Magazine and The Magical Star by Cek & Ricek. The main single Tegar was also used as original soundtrack for Indonesian soap opera Suami, Istri & Dia. In 2000, the album Tegar was also released in Malaysia under BMG Music.

At the end of July 2000, Rossa released her new album entitled Hati Yang Terpilih exclusively for the soap opera of the same name. Outside Indonesia, Rossa actively performed in events such as the Asian Music Festival and My Love in Hanoi, Vietnam on 26 October 2000. She also received the honour of "Best Progressive - Pop Solo Female Artist" at the Anugerah Musik Indonesia (AMI Awards) award in 2001 for her album's achievement of being sold more than 450,000 copies. Her second single Biarkan Cinta itu Ada from the album Tegar was also used as the soundtrack of the soap opera Tersayang in Brunei in 2001.

Although busy singing and studying, Rossa finally managed to finish her studies at the Faculty of Social and Political Science, University of Indonesia (UI) in February 2002. In May 2002, Rossa released a single entitled KINI. This single is part of Rossa's new album entitled "Kini," created by nine reliable Indonesian musicians such as Yovie Widianto, Iszur Muchtar, Melly Goeslaw, and others released on April 30, 2002. She received the honour of "Best Female Solo Artist" at the Indonesian Music Awards (6th AMI Awards, 2002) for her album's achievement of selling more than 500,000 copies. She also starred in the soap opera entitled Perisai Kasih with her song Kepastian as its original soundtrack. The album Kini was relaunched by Rossa with the addition of a new song titled Malam Pertama composed by Melly Goeslaw exclusively for the soap opera of the same name. This album went double platinum in 2004. Her single "Malam Pertama" was also ranked 3rd on MTV Ampuh Indonesia for eight weeks under Indonesia's all-time MTV Chart List section.

In December 2004, Rossa released a new album entitled Kembali. A year later, Rossa was chosen as an MTV Malaysia Exclusive Artist (January 2005) and MTV Ampuh Artist of The Month (February 2005). The album Kembali was released in Malaysia on 12 May 2005 under the guidance of Suria Records with her mini concert being held at Planet Hollywood, Malaysia on 23 May 2005 for promotion. She was also awarded "The Best Female Singer" by the Anugerah Musik Indonesia (AMI Awards, 9th, 2005).

In the same year (2005), Rossa contributed in the making of the compilation album entitled From Us to U to salute the legendary singer and artist, Titiek Puspa. On the album, Rossa was trusted to sing a legendary song Cinta that belongs to Titiek Puspa. Rossa also sang Marilah Kemari with various artists who were also involved in the making of this album.

Rossa was also nominated for an award by MTV Asia Awards on 28 February 2006 in Bangkok as one of the representatives of Indonesia.
 On 26 December 2006, she launched her latest album entitled Yang Terpilih with three hits songs; Terlalu Cinta, Atas Nama Cinta, and Tak Termiliki. Atas Nama Cinta was chosen as the soundtrack of the soap opera Cinta Fitri by MD Entertainment. In Malaysia, the album Yang Terpilih was released on 16 May 2007. She also won an award from Anugerah Industri Muzik (AIM 15th, 2008) as "Best Malay Song Performed by a Foreign Artist".

2007–2012: Ayat-Ayat Cinta – X-Factor Indonesia 
In December 2007, Rossa again showed her talents as an Indonesian Music Diva with the release of a new single entitled Ayat-Ayat Cinta which was exclusively made for the film of the same name, which aired on 28 February 2008. This single has won many awards such as "The Best Female Singer" category by the Anugerah Musik Indonesia (AMI Awards 11th, 2008), The Most Popular Singer (SCTV Awards, 2008), The Best Favorite Singer (SWA Magazine), and Best Malay Song Performed by a Foreign Artist – Anugerah Industri Muzik (AIM 16th, 2009).

Rossa also performed Takdir Cinta and Tercipta Untukku ft. Ungu in Malaysia. The single Ayat-Ayat Cinta broke the record by being the most downloaded song with around 700,000 downloads. Rossa also had the chance to perform at the Asian Night Olympic Games in Beijing, China (2008) as the representative of Indonesia.

Rossa's single concert on 26 November 2008, with the assistance of Jay Subiyakto and Erwin Gutawa, was finally realised with the title Persembahan Cinta at the Jakarta Convention Centre (JCC) accompanied by Ungu and Melly Goeslaw as her special guests. The tickets sold out three weeks before the concert with attendees numbering around 6,000. Success in Jakarta, Rossa also held concert "Persembahan Cinta" in Surabaya & Bandung in 2009.

Rossa released a self-titled album "Rossa" on 14 January 2009. The single of this album was entitled Terlanjur Cinta, a duet with Pasha (Ungu's lead singer), Hati Yang Kau Sakiti, Tega and many more. To promote this album, Rossa also held a concert tour "Cerita Cinta" in 7 major cities in Indonesia plus 1 concert in Kuala Lumpur, Malaysia. The same year, Rossa was awarded "The Best Inspiring Woman (Kartini Awards, 2009)" and "The Best Video Clip Inbox Awards 2009". Rossa was also awarded in Malaysia as "The Best Malay Song Performed by a Foreign Artist – Anugerah Industri Muzik (AIM 16th, 2009)".

On 23 May 2010, Rossa held a mega concert entitled Melodi Cinta in Stadium Putra Bukit Jalil (Axiata Arena), Malaysia with more than 12,000 attendees. This concert also introduced special guests; Ungu, ST12, Aizat, Permata Seni Choir, Permata Seni Muzik Tunas, Yovie Widianto heading the Orchestra, and Jay Subiyakto as the Art Director. The concert was supported by Datin Paduka Seri Rosmah Mansor (the Malaysian Prime Minister's Wife), politician Agum Gumelar and his wife Linda Gumelar. So far, Rossa is the only Indonesian artist capable of holding such a large solo concert in Malaysia and sold out. Even reportedly, Rossa was paid 10 billion for this concert.

Following the success of the mega concert, Rossa released a new album entitled Harmoni Jalinan Nada & Cerita with three popular songs; Memeluk Bulan, Jagad Khayalku, and Ku Menunggu. She was awarded by Halo Selebriti as the Most Favorite Female Artist, The Best Female Singer Album-SCTV Music Awards 2010 (for the Rossa album), The Best Malay Song Performed by a Foreign Artist-Anugerah Industri Muzik (AIM 18th, 2011) for single Ku Menunggu, and The Best Female Singer-Anugerah Planet Muzik (APM 10th, 2011) for the album Harmoni Jalinan Nada & Cerita.

On 11 October 2011, Rossa held her own concert outside of Indonesia, in Esplanade, Singapore. The concert was entitled Harmoni Cinta. She launched a new single at the concert, Aku Bersahaja which was sung together with Taufik Batisah. This concert was attended by 1,800 fans. At the end of 2011, Rossa released an album entitled The Best of Rossa in Indonesia, with three popular songs; Jangan Ada Dusta Diantara Kita ft. Broery Marantika, Tak Sanggup Lagi, and One Night Lover ft. Joe Flizzow. Two more songs were added to the album for the international market, Ku Pinang Kau Dengan Bismillah, and Aku Bersahaja. In Indonesia, the album sold more than 1,5 million copies and was ranked 10th on the list of Indonesian all time best selling albums. Along with this album, Rossa won awards for the region and national acknowledgement. In addition, the duet with Joe Flizzow One Night Lover delivered Rossa as a singer in New York Fashion Week (2012), and her name was listed in Global Grind, a well-known entertainment website in the US.

Apart from her activity as a singer, Rossa also expanded her activities into the family karaoke business, and established Diva Family Karaoke. Currently, it is one of the biggest family karaoke establishments in Indonesia. She was also appointed by Fremantle Media as one of the judges for X-Factor Indonesia (Season 1) and with her coaching, her contestant won.

2013–2016: Salahkah – Jangan Hilangkan Dia 
Rossa was endowed with a title of nobility from Keraton Surakarta as "Kanjeng Mas Ayu Tumenggung Sri Rossa Swarakaloka", as well as the title of nobility from the Pahang Kingdom, Malaysia, as "Dato'". Rossa is the only singer from Indonesia to be given this prestigious title.

At the end of 2013, Rossa released the single Salahkah along with Malaysian singer, Hafiz Suip, which was exclusively made for the Malaysian soap opera Bukan Kerana Aku Cinta. This song received five nominations in World Music Award under the following categories: World's Best Female Artist, World's Best World's Live Act, World's Best Song, World's Best Entertainer of the Year, and World's Best Video. This song was also included in her latest album entitled Love, Life & Music.

At the launching of that album in May 2014. Rossa broke the Indonesian Record World Museum (MURI) and the Indonesia Recording Industry Associationas (ASIRI) with the Special Edition of her album Love, Life & Music selling more than 100,000 copies in a day, and the Standart Edition of this album Love, Life & Music get the Triple Platinum Award. Rossa plotted Hijrah Cinta for the Indonesian market and it was used as the soundtrack of the Indonesian film of the same name. For the international market, Rossa plotted Salahkah ft. Hafiz as the hit single. Rossa then received a knighthood from the Surakarta palace to become "Kanjeng Mas Ayu Sri Rossa Swarakaloka". Afterwards, Fremantle Media appointed Rossa as one of judges of the X-Factor Indonesia Season 2 and again she won with her contestant. This album was awarded the Multi-Platinum Awards on 30 January 2015 and Million Awards in June 2015.

The Ministry of Tourism and Creative Economy of Republik Indonesia appointed Rossa to sing the jingles Pesona Indonesia and Wonderful Indonesia as Indonesia's tourism branding to go international. This campaign was promoted in the international media such as; Astro TV, National Geographic Australia, FX-Australia, Channel News Asia, FOX Channels, CCTV China, CNBC International, Channel 5, Channel 8, Channel U, MBN, MBC, TV3, TBS, TV Asahi Channel 1, Channel 7, Channel 9, Aljazeera, Diva (Asia TV channel), Discovery Channel, Travel Living Channel/AFC, CNN International, BBC World, Sport Channels, Time Square New York and many more.

Rossa held a concert in 2015 at Istana Budaya (Malaysia) entitled Malam Keajaiban Cinta Dato Rossa that gained an audience of 2,500 per night. Rossa created magic, the first Indonesian artist to hold two days of concerts at the Istana Budaya (Malaysia), which also broke the record as the most expensive tickets sold for a concert (the price itself being RM 1,500). In addition, Rossa also held a concert in Persada Johor International Convention Centre entitled Pesona Cinta Dato Rossa with 1,800 attendees.

In early January 2016, Rossa held a concert again at Istana Budaya (Malaysia) entitled Raja & Rakyat Berpisah Tiada along with seven Malaysian singers to commemorate Sultan Pahang's birthday. It broke the record of the most expensive ticket prices at RM 5,000. Rossa recorded a new single Jangan Hilangkan Dia from Ryan D'Masiv, arranged by an International musician, Tushar Apte. The song was first released in four countries and was ranked number one on "iTunes Soundtrack" for six months. Rossa also performed at the event "21 Asian Television Awards" on 2 December 2016 as a representative from Indonesia. Afterwards, Rossa went to Los Angeles in July to record her latest album, with Mitch Allan as her vocal producer.

2017–2019: A New Chapter – SM Entertainment 
On 5 April 2017, Rossa produced a new album entitled A New Chapter which incorporated new genres such as EDM, Electronic Pop and Urban with support from international musicians from Hollywood who had previously worked with international singers Demi Lovato, Justin Bieber, One Direction, Rihanna and many more. This album has four English songs and the remaining five are in Indonesian.

Rossa herself is the First Asian Artist Who Collaborated with a World Class Musician, namely Mitch Allan, Tushar Apte, Fiona Bevan, Stuart Chricton, Gatlin Green, Hugo Lira, Thomas Gustafsson, Negin Djafari, Steve Shebby, Joleen Belle, Michelle Buzz, and Nikki Leonti when producing this album. Her new English single entitled Body Speak enabled Rossa to be the "First Indonesia Artist" who made an appearance on MTV Asia Spotlight Artist for one whole month. According to Peter Coquillard, the executive producer for the four English songs on the new album, namely A New Chapter, these songs were initially planned for Celine Dion's new album in the future but Rossa was proud to be given the honor to sing these songs.

To commemorate the 21 years of her career in the music industry, Rossa held a concert entitled The Journey of 21 Dazzling Years at the Jakarta Convention Center (JCC) with the help of Jay Subiyakto as Art Director and Tohpati as the head of the Orchestra. It was attended by a crowd of 6,000. Her latest album, A New Chapter went 4× Platinum on 4 October 2017. She is believed to be singing a title for the soundtrack of the film Ayat-Ayat Cinta 2 entitled Bulan Dikekang Malam that was released on 20 October 2017. Rossa also held another sold-out concert at Esplanade, Singapore in 2017, also based on "The Journey of 21 Dazzling Years".

In early 2018, Rossa released some new singles including Pernah Memiliki (ft. D’Masiv), Bukan Maksudku (taken from the album A New Chapter) and The Good Is Back (ft. Anggun). Rossa received prestigious "Intellectual Property Award 2018" by the Indonesia Directorate General of Intellectual Property Rights for her contribution for Indonesian music. She's also awarded by SCTV Music Awards 2018 as "The Best Female Singer" for her song Bulan Dikekang Malam.

In July 2018, Rossa was announced to be one of the performers in the Opening Ceremony of the 2018 Asian Games along with Anggun, Joey Alexander, Tulus, Raisa and others. Rossa was also appointed to be the judge of the Indonesian Idol Junior Season 3 with Maia Estianty, Rayi (RAN) and Rizky Febian. In addition, Rossa was also announced to be the filler of the song "HARA – Equilibrium Earth" created by Melly Goeslaw and produced by Rinaldy Yunardi. The single will be launched in August 2018 in collaboration with WWF Indonesia for the "Save Our Earth" campaign. Rossa received the highest award from Anugerah Planet Music Award 2018, "Planet Music Special Award / Legend Award" on 28 September 2018 in Singapore, for being considered an Indonesian artist who successfully in the region's music market, where the albums are always selling well until the concert tickets are always sold out not only in Indonesia.

On 1 October 2018, the Rising Star Indonesia also officially announced that Rossa would again be the judge of Rising Star Indonesia Season 3 with Ariel, Judika and Yovie Widianto. she was also accorded one of the Pahang's highest state decorations, Darjah Sri Sultan Ahmad Shah Pahang (SSAP), by the then-Regent of Pahang, Tengku Abdullah Sultan Ahmad Shah with title of nobility "Dato' Sri", making her the only Indonesian artist with such title from Malaysia. She has also won an award from the Big Apple Music Awards 2018 in the United States as The Best Indonesian Artist 2018. Rossa was then appointed by the Ministry of Environment and Forestry of Indonesia to become their brand ambassador.

On 21 February 2019, Rossa made a scene in the country and Korea's entertainment scene by holding a press conference in Indonesia that she would collaborate with Super Juniors full members. Accompanied by Mr. Chairul Tanjung (Transmedia), Leeteuk (Super Junior), Lee Soo-man (Founder and Producer of SM Entertainment),  (CEO / Chief SM Entertainment), and other SM Entertainment officials, they explained that collaboration between Rossa and Super Junior will be released in early 2020. Rossa  officially became the first Indonesian and Southeast Asias solo artist to join under the auspices of the label and management of SM Entertainment. She also appeared as a special guest star in the Super Junior concert Super Show 7 World Tour held at ICE BSD City, Tangerang on 15 June 2019. At the concert, Rossa performed her song Tegar in duet with Yesung and Ryeowook, both Super Junior members. She also performed her song Pudar in front of over 20,000 people.

Near the end of 2019, Rossa held a concert tour titled Tegar 2.0 in four major cities in Indonesia, namely Jakarta, Bandung, Yogyakarta and Surabaya. It was held to commemorate the 20th anniversary of the release of the album Tegar in 1999. Together with this concert, Rossa released a single titled Tegar 2.0 which was specially arranged by 2018 Asian Games music composer Ronald Steven and Gamaliel (GAC) as the vocal director. This concert also succeeded in gaining an audience of more than 15,000 people.

2020–present: Masih and Now 
On 4 March 2020, Rossa released a new single entitled Masih by Yovie Widianto and Nino Kayam under the Inspire Music label (Rossa's independent label). It was first played at her concert celebrating 21 years in the music industry. In promoting this single, Rossa created a mini-series titled Masih Cinta Terbaik, which was produced by herself and assisted by MAV Production Asia, a production house that had developed a variety of short film and series content in Indonesia. It was widely shown on VIU and Wahana Creator Nusantara as a team of script writers who have received many awards in writing and developing film stories such as Dua Garis Biru, Possesif, Keluarga Cemara, Habibie & Ainun, Rudy Habibie, Bumi Manusia, Laskar Pelangi and Bukaan 8.

The second single of the same year was Sangcheo Badeun Maemum / The Heart You Hurt / Hati Yang Kau Sakiti (Korean Version). It was officially released on 14 August 2020 by holding a press conference via the VLIVE application with Southeast Asian and South Korean media. Rossa then collaborated with Lee Dong-hae (Super Junior) and Dion Wiyoko for the official video clip. Previously, Rossa also collaborated with SM Entertainment Actor, Ki Do Hoon for the official video clip "Masih". She is the first Indonesian artist in history with multi No.1 achievement on the biggest all digital music platforms in the same year (2020).

In 2021, Rossa released a single titled "Wanita" which was composed by Ryan D'Masiv and mastered by Randy Merrill. An engineer who subscribes to the Grammy Awards who usually handles the albums of international singers such as Taylor Swift, Adele, Ariana Grande, Lady Gaga, and many more. This single is dedicated to Rossa to appreciate the great women who always fight for their families, especially during the COVID-19 pandemic like this. Di single ini Rossa juga mendapatkan kesempatan pertama dari Apple Music sebagai Artist Asia Tenggara Pertama yang mendapatkan fitur terbaru Spatial Audio (Dolby Atmos). Rossa juga dipilih oleh Spotify sebagai perwakilan Indonesia untuk kampanye "SPOTIFY EQUAL" selama bulan Agustus 2021.

On November 26, 2021, Rossa launched a new song entitled "Terlalu Berharap," composed by Andmesh Kamaleng and arranged by Andi Rianto in Hungary. Rossa sang this song specifically for the film entitled "Love Knots," starring Beby Tsabina, Rizky Nazar, Brisia Jodie, Vladimir Rama, and others on November 29, 2021, aired on tiket.com for two weeks.

This film is Inspire Music's first film project released after one year. It was previously successful with several live streaming programs such as KOMAX, Nelusur, Brisia Jodie Concert, Afgan Rossa Concert, and others. Rossa has a dual role as a film soundtrack, cameo, and executive producer of this film for this project. This mini-album from the Love Knots film was released on December 17, 2021, with several other soundtracks such as Gabriel Prince, Ririe Moeya, Gaza Ali, Azzahra Banillia & Gayatri Candra.

In February 2022, Rossa again made new history as the most listened-to Indonesian-language female singer on the Apple Music application with a total of more than 16 million playbacks during January 2022 only in Indonesia. Rossa then released the single “Sekali Ini Saja” and held a solo concert "Rossa 25 Shining Years" in 6 major Indonesian cities namely Jakarta, Surabaya, Bandung, Medan, Lampung & Palembang" as well as one in Kuala Lumpur, Malaysia to commemorate 25 years of journey Rossa's career in the Music Industry.

To celebrate 25 years of journey, Rossa collaborated with 4 music directors & 4 fashion designers from Indonesia & internationally. One of them is the clothing designer for the Met Gala, Grammy Awards, and Oscar & Hollywood celebrities such as Lady Gaga, Beyoncé, & Céline Dion namely Iris Van Herpen & Rick Owens. For the Iris Van Herpen design alone, Rossa reportedly used an Haute Couture dress worth 1.1 billion rupiah, which was specially imported from Europe.

This concert became the most expensive concert by an Indonesian singer after the pandemic with ticket sales reaching 10 million per ticket for RSVP tickets and sold-out. Meanwhile, the Rossa 25 Shining Years concert broke the ticket price for the most expensive Indonesian artist's concert in history in Malaysia with a selling price of RM 5,000 per ticket for RSVP tickets and sold out. The concert was attended by 3,000 people and mostly royalty, businessmen, and Malaysian artists.

Image & Artistry 
Rossa started her singing career as a child lady rocker. Her singing ability that was above average made her successful side by side on the same stage with the top lady rockers at that time, such as Nicky Astria, Nike Ardilla, Mel Shandy, Ita Purnamasari, etc. In 1987, the late Betawi culturalist Benyamin Sueb once predicted that Rossa would be an Indonesian pearl whose name would bring Indonesia's good name to foreign countries if she moved to Jakarta. Celine Dion, Mariah Carey, Nicky Astria & Ruth Sahanaya are the singers used as inspirational figures for Rossa. Since childhood, Rossa has been accustomed to performing from city to city & has won several national-level music awards. Little Rossa is not only good at singing. But he is also good at education.

Rossa's singing talent came from her mother, Eni Kusmiani, a traditional Sundanese singer. While she can obtain Rossa's intelligence from her father, Ukas Herawan, who is good at mathematics. While sitting in elementary school, Rossa won only 2nd place in her class. And the rest always get 1st place. During junior high & high school, she also never came out of her class's 1, 2 & 3 positions. Even when he entered the University of Indonesia, he entered through talent scouting for admission to the state university system or achievement.

Born in the cassette & cd era but succeeded in the streaming era, Rossa is the first Indonesian Diva who has succeeded in breaking the paradigm in society that singers in the cassette era cannot co-exist with singers in the streaming era. She managed to establish herself as the "Queen of Streaming Music Indonesia." The legendary composer "Yovie Widianto" said that Rossa was a diva who could survive across generations.

One of the biggest music platforms globally, Spotify, calls Rossa a "Music Legend" from most people in Indonesia. While Apple Music deems Rossa worthy of joining the grand tradition of "Icon Pop." Indonesian singer who has gone global, Anggun C Sasmi, in calling Rossa a singer who has an alter-ego or many versions. That is between a singer, a businessman & a mother. Meanwhile, singer Agnez Mo, during her time as a judge on Indonesian Idol, said that Rossa was one of the Indonesian singers who never made a mistake in every appearance, including the pitch and everything else is perfect. Rossa is also a female solo singer who contributes the most significant music royalties to 7 Indonesian music composers such as Melly Goeslaw, Icha Jikustik, Hendra Nurcahya, Yovie Widianto, Mery LC, Enda Ungu, & Rian D'Masiv.

Art Stage Director "Jay Subiyakto," said Rossa was a Diva who didn't need any gimmicks in her appearance at the press conference of The Journey of 21 Dazzling Years.

Singer, Producer & Politician Anang Hermansyah said Rossa was a complete Diva.

Meanwhile, Music Arranger "Tohpati," said that Rossa was a true hits maker.

Aside from being a pop singer, Rossa is also able to sing traditional Sundanese songs, dangdut, hip-hop, EDM & r&b. Rossa has also recorded songs in other language such as Malay, English, and Korean. Actress and entertainer Nagita Slavina called Rossa the "Diva Millenial Indonesia" because even though Rossa's songs were not released in the streaming era, her songs are still well known among kids from Generation Z. Meanwhile, singer Raisa said Rossa was a singer who always existed in every generation.

Singer & songwriter who graduated with a music degree in Singapore, Isyana Sarasvati, said that Rossa is an inspirational figure because she has a perfect musical side as a singer.

Achievements & Influence 
During 25 Years of Work, Rossa has had more than 92 albums (including solos, compilations, and so on), more than 115 Awards, more than 155 Soundtracks, more than 130 songs, No.1 hits on Radio, physical album sales with over 11 million copies. as of 2021, 48 Singles over 1 Million Streams on Spotify (most for Indonesian female singers in the streaming era), and the queen of Indonesian music streaming (total of all credits). She is the most active Indonesian diva holding concerts every year starting in 2008 at JCC, including surrounding countries such as Malaysia, Singapore & Brunei Darussalam, with a total of more than 48 concerts, not including several other artists and other performances.

Her album entitled "The Best of Rossa (2011)" was included in the list of the 10 Best Selling Indonesian Albums of All Time, his album entitled "Love, Life & Music (2014)" sold 100,000 CDs in one day. Her album entitled "Platinum Collection" (2013)" became the most streamed Indonesian-language album by female singers on Spotify.

Rossa is the only Indonesian diva who has successfully held a solo concert at the Putra Bukit Jalil Stadium with an audience of more than 12,000 people in 2010. This concert is the biggest Indonesian singer in Malaysia to date. Rossa also holds the highest ticket sales price at Istana Budaya, Malaysia, at RM 1500 & RM 5000. She still holds the record for the single downloads, more than 700,000 downloads in just eight months. According to RIM (Recording Industry Association of Malaysia) data, even Western singers like Avril Lavigne Gwen Stefani are far below Rossa.

Rossa is the first Indonesian singer to popularize the term duet with a deceased singer and then re-recorded it into a new song with a different version in her single entitled "Jangan Ada Dusta Diantara Kita (feat. Almarhum Broery Marantika)" in 2011. Followed by other singers such as Adlani Rambe in the song "Live My Own (feat. Almarhumah Nike Ardilla) in 2020, Inka Christie in the song "Cinta Kita (feat. The late Nike Ardilla)" in 2021, Zeroid Park in the music "Sandiwara Cinta (feat. The late Nike Ardilla)" in 2021.

In 2020 Rossa released a single titled "The Heart You Hurt / Sangcheo Badeun Museum (The Heart You Hurt Korean Version)," which translated from the Indonesian song entitled "Hati Yang Kau Sakiti" and then translated into Korean by Rossa.

Although "The Heart You Hurt was released by accident by Rossa, many Indonesian & Malaysian artists followed Rossa's footsteps to translate their songs into Korean as Tiara Andini feat. Arsy Widianto in the song "Bahaya (Korean Version)" in 2021, Aina Abdul (Malaysian Singer) in the music "Sepi (Korean Version)" in 2021, Suara Kayu in the music "Miniatur (Korean Version)" in 2021, Bertrand Peto Putra Onsu in the music "Deritaku (Korean Version)" in 2021, Armada in the music "Aku Dimatamu (Korean Version)" in 2021, Anneth Delliecia in the music "Mungkin Hari Ini Esok Atau Nanti (Korean Version)" in 2021 and Ghea Indrawari feat. Boy William in the music "Bucketlist (Korean Version)" in 2021.

As a diva & hits maker, her beautiful songs are also sung by singers across generations such as Marsha (Indonesian Idol), who re-sung the song "Tegar" in 2007; D'Langit Band, who re-sung the song "Pudar" in 2011, Jikustik, who sang the song "Aku Bukan Untukmu" in 2011, Cindy Bernadette who sang the song "Perawan Cinta" in 2013, Marcell Siahaan who sang the song "Kini" in 2013, Titi DJ who sang the song again the song "Terlalu Cinta" in 2015, The Sibling who sang the song "Tegar" in 2016, Yesa Lona (dangdut singer) who sang the song "Nada-Nada Cinta" in 2021 & most recently Tissa Biani who sang the song again "Atas Nama Cinta" in 2021.

Rossa is also the only Diva who gets the highest nobility from the Surakarta Hadiningrat Palace & Pahang Kingdom, Malaysia. Rossa is also the first Indonesian singer to receive the "Anugerah Planet Muzik Special Awards (Category: Legend Award)" in the history of Indonesian music. She is also the First Indonesian Singer & First Southeast Asian Solo Singer signed by SM Entertainment.

Discography 

Rossa started her career as a child singer. She released her first album entitled Gadis Ingusan in 1988, followed by Untuk Sahabatku in 1990, but unfortunately, the sales of both albums did not reach maximum results. The third album and Rossa's first adult album, Nada-Nada Cinta, was released in 1996 and immediately sold 750,000 copies. In 1999, Rossa's fourth album, Tegar, was released and received 4× Platinum Awards in just three months, followed by the next album, Hati Yang Terpilih, released in 2000. The album, entitled Kini, was released in 2002, and the album Kembali was released in 2004, followed by the album Yang Terpilih which was released in 2006. From the six albums, Rossa released many popular hits not only in Indonesia but also in neighboring countries. In 2007, Rossa became the lead singer on Ayat-Ayat Cinta's soundtrack album. Finally, in 2009, Rossa released her tenth album, entitled Rossa or Self-Titled. Of all her albums (one best and one with other artists), Rossa has released many hit singles that are very popular until now. His albums also scored success everywhere, from getting Platinum, Multi-Platinum to Million Sales Album.

Studio albums
 Gadis Ingusan (1988)
 Untuk Sahabatku (1990)
 Nada-Nada Cinta (1996)
 Tegar (1999)
 Hati Yang Terpilih (2000)
 Kini (2002)
 Kini (Repackaged Edition) (2003)
 Kembali (2004)
 Yang Terpilih (2006)
 Rossa (2009)
 Harmoni Jalinan Nada & Cerita (2010)
 The Best of Rossa (2011)
 Platinum Collection (2013)
 Love, Life & Music (2014)
 A New Chapter (2017)
 Another Journey: The Beginning (2023)

Compilation Albums
 From Us To U (Tribute To Titiek Puspa) - 2005
 MTV Ampuh Hits of the Year (2006)
 OST. Ayat-Ayat Cinta (2007)
 Dahsyat (2009)
 MTV Ampuh Hits of the Year 3 (2009)
 Sinar Lebaran (Malaysia Edition) - 2010
 Dahsyat Vol. 2 (2010)
 Takbir Raya (Malaysia Edition) - 2010
 Bebi Romeo Masterpiece "album Bebi Romeo" (2012)
 OST. Soekarno (2013)
 KFC Adu Bintang (2013)
 Havoc (Malaysia Edition) "album Joe Flizzow" - 2013
 Anugerah-Mu (Malaysia Edition) - 2014
 Melodi Melankolik (Malaysia Edition) - 2014
 The Best of Nada Kita (2017)
 OST. Ayat-Ayat Cinta 2 (2018)
 Engergy of Asia (Official Album of Asian Games 2018)
 69 Tahun Perjalanan Karir Titiek Puspa (2021)

Singles
 Setinggi Mimpi Mereka - UNICEF Indonesia (Theme Song 2008)
 Sang Surya - OST. Sang Pencerah (2010)
 Kebebasan - Yonder Music Indonesia (Theme Song 2016)
 Pesona Indonesia - Kementerian Pariwisata dan Ekonomi Kreatif Republik Indonesia (Theme Song 2015)
 Wonderful Indonesia - Kementerian Pariwisata dan Ekonomi Kreatif Republik Indonesia (Theme Song 2015)
 Satu Indonesiaku (2016)
 Kebebasan - Yonder Music Indonesia (Theme Song 2016)
 Satu Indonesiaku (2017)
 Bright As The Sun - Asian Games 2018 (Theme Song 2017)
 Hidup Itu Indah (Life Is Beautiful) - Oriflame (Theme Song 2018)
 Pernah Memiliki feat. D’Masiv & David "Noah" (2018)
 Cahaya Dalam Sunyi feat. All Artist - Quran ID Project (2018)
 The Good Is Back feat. Anggun (2018)
 HARA "Equilibrium Earth" feat. All Artists (2018)
 Mars Rimbawan - Kementerian Lingkungan Hidup dan Kehutanan Republik Indonesia (Theme Song 2019)
 Sampah Sayang feat. Titiek Puspa & All Artist (2019)
 Karena Cinta Yang Menemani - OST. Susi Susanti Love All (2019)
 Tegar 2.0 (2019)
 Masih - OST. Masih Cinta Terbaik (2020)
 Satu Cara (2020)
 Indonesia Bersatu (2020)
 The Heart You Hurt / Hati Yang Kau Sakiti - Korean Version (2020)
 Wanita (2021)
 Bertahanlah (2021)
 Zambrud Khatulistiwa feat. All Artists - Resso Version (2021)
 Terlalu Berharap - OST. Love Knots (2021)
 Sekali Ini Saja (2022)

Digital albums
 The History (Nokia Special Edition) - 2010
 Symphony of Praises (2012)
 Number One (2012)
 Sambut Ramadhan (2013)
 Platinum Collection (Nokia Mix Radio Special Edition) - 2013
 Konsert Mega Bintang (2013)
 The History (iTunes Special Edition) - 2014
 Marhaban Ya Ramadhan (2014)
 Top Hits (2014)
 Ear Candy (2016)
 OST. Masih Cinta Terbaik (2020)
 OST. Love Knots (2021)

Concerts 

Rossa is an Indonesian singer who often holds solo concerts in her country and neighboring countries such as Malaysia, Singapore & Brunei Darussalam. Rossa even managed to establish her name in Malaysia as the first Indonesian artist to successfully hold a solo concert filled with more than 12,000 spectators at the Bukit Jalil Stadium, Malaysia (2010) and was attended by high-ranking state officials such as Datin Sri Rosmah Mansor (Malaysia), Mrs. Linda Gumelar (Minister of Indonesian Women Empowerment) & Mr. Agum Gumelar (Indonesia). Her solo concert with the theme "Malam Keajaiban Cinta Dato Rossa" at the Honorary Stage of the Istana Budaya, Malaysia, in 2015 further strengthened his DIVA prestige that he was not only one of the number one DIVA in Indonesia but also in Malaysia. Her concert ticket set a record as an Indonesian artist with the most expensive concert ticket paid in Malaysia, with ticket prices reaching RM518 for the public and RM1500 for the royals. Her concert tickets were sold out in less than 2 hours. Many Malaysian Royal Highnesses attended this solo concert.

Meanwhile, his concert with six other Datos, entitled the "Raja & Rakyat Split Tiada," concert on February 17, 2016, at the Istana Budaya, managed to break the record for selling the most expensive tickets in the history of Malaysian music, which reached a price of RM 5000. This concert was held to commemorate the birthday of Sultan Pahang, who 85th. And as usual, the concert tickets were also sold out. At the end of 2018, Rossa held a mini-concert entitled "Grand Fantasia With Rossa" with a 1.5-20 million Rupiah ticket price. Like Rossa's other concerts, Rossa's concert tickets are also sold out. On February 14, 2019, Rossa again held a mini-concert entitled "Rossa Live In Concert - Cinta Dalam My Life" at 350 thousand Rupiah - 25 million Rupiah. Dan tiketnya pun kembali sold-out 5 hari sebelum acara. And the tickets were again sold-out five days before the event.

Singer and judge for the Judika talent show said Rossa was the Queen of Concerts in Indonesia. The same thing was also expressed by the prominent presenter of Metro TV, Alvin Adam, who stated in his biography "The Story Book Just Alvin Part.2" that Rossa was the Queen of Concert Indonesia (Queen of Concert) in Indonesia because there were too many requests to sing at concerts. Rossa's 25 Shining Years concert in Malaysia also broke the record for being the most expensive solo concert by an Indonesian singer in history, with ticket prices reaching RM 5,000.

Solo concerts
 Persembahan Cinta (JCC, Indonesia) - 2008
 Persembahan Cinta Mini (Bandung & Surabaya) - 2009
 Cerita Cinta (Road Tour in 7 Town in Indonesia & 1 in Malaysia) - 2009
 Melodi Cinta Rossa (Stadium Bukit Jalil, Malaysia) - 2010
 Harmoni Cinta Rossa (Esplanade, Singapura) - 2011
 Malam Keajaiban Cinta (Istana Budaya, Malaysia) - 2015
 Pesona Cinta Rossa (Persada Johor International Convention Centre, Malaysia) - 2015
 The Journey Of 21 Dazzling Years (JCC, Jakarta) - April 2017
 The Journey Of 21 Dazzling Years (Esplanade, Singapura) - November 2017
 A New Chapter (Bali, Indonesia) - December 2017
 Grand Fantasia With Rossa (Jakarta, Indonesia) - December 2018
 Rossa Live In Concert "Cinta Dalam Hidupku" (Jakarta, Indonesia) - February 2019
 Tegar 2.0 (Road Tour 4 Town in Indonesia) - 2019
 25 Shining Years (Road Tour 6 Town in Indonesia) + 1 in Malaysia - 2022

Exclusive Concerts
 An Evening With Rossa (Kuala Lumpur, Malaysia) - 2010
 One Night Lover with Rossa (Indonesia) - 2012
 Atas Nama Cinta Dato’ Rossa (Kuala Lumpur, Malaysia) - 2013
 Konser Nusantara (Istana Budaya, Kuala Lumpur, Malaysia) - 2015
 Malam Gala Cinta Tanpa Sempadan Exclusive With Dato’ Rossa (Kuala Lumpur, Malaysia) - 2014
 Raja dan Rakyat Berpisah Tiada (Istana Budaya, Kuala Lumpur, Malaysia) - 2015
 New Year's Eve Celebration With Rossa & Kahitna (Bandung, Indonesia) - 2019

Online Concerts
 Tegar 2.0 (Jakarta & Bandung) - 2020
 Galau Rossa & Nagita Slavina (Indonesia) - 2020
 Afgan Rossa The Concert - 2021

TV concert
 Stars On Stage "Special Rossa" - ANTV (Indonesia) - 2005
 By Request "Special Rossa - Kembali" - SCTV (Indonesia) - 2005
 Class On Campus "Special Rossa" ANTV (Indonesia) - 2005
 Platinum Muzik "Special Rossa" - ASTRO (Malaysia) - 2006
 Class On Air "Special Rossa" - ANTV (Indonesia) - 2006
 Musik Asyik "Special Nada-Nada Cinta Terpilih Rossa" - ANTV (Indonesia) - 2006
 Nite of Soulful Stars "Special Rossa" - NTV7 (Malaysia) - 2007
 Persembahan Cinta (TV Version) - SCTV & TV3 (Indonesia & Malaysia) - 2008
 By Request "Special Rossa (Self Titled Rossa)" - SCTV (Indonesia) - 2009
 Melodi Cinta (TV Version) - TRANS TV & TV3 (Indonesia & Malaysia) - 2010
 Atas Nama Cinta - Astro Ria (Malaysia) - 2010
 Harmoni Cinta (TV Version) - ANTV & Suria (Indonesia & Singapura) - 2011
 K20 "Special Rossa" - Kompas TV (Indonesia) - 2013
 Malam Keajaiban Cinta Dato’ Rossa (TV Version) - TV3 (Malaysia) - 2015
 The Journey of 21 Dazzling Years (TV Version) - TRANS TV (Indonesia) - 2017
 Suara Hati Istri - Indosiar (Indonesia) - 2020
 Hijrah Cinta Rossa & Lesti - Indosiar (Indonesia) - 2020
 Concert Galau Rossa & Nagita Slavina (TV Version) - ANTV (Indonesia) - 2020
 Rossa & Afgan The Concert (TV Version) - ANTV (Indonesia) - 2021
 25 Tahun Rossa - RCTI (Indonesia) - 2021
 Rossa 25 Shining Years (Indonesia) - 2022

Filmography

Mini Series

Film

Soap Opera

Video Clip

Music competitions 
 Superstar Show - Grandfinal - 2008 (Guest Mentor)
Indonesian Idol Season 6 (2010)
X-Factor Indonesia Season 1 – 2013 (Winner)
Rising Star Indonesia Season 1 – 2013 (Guest Mentor)
Mamamia Show Season 4 - 2014 (Guest Mentor)
X-Factor Indonesia Season 2 – 2015 (Winner)
Rising Star Indonesia Season 2 (2016)
 3 Juara Malaysia ('Ballad' category) – 2016 (Winner)
Indonesian Idol Junior Season 3 (2018)
Rising Star Indonesia Season 3 (2018)
D'Star Indonesia – Grandfinal – 2019 (Guest Mentor)
Indonesian Idol Season 10 – 2020 (Guest Mentor)
Byarr Indonesia (2020)
Indonesian Idol Season 11 - A New Chapter (2021)
X-Factor Indonesia Season 3 (2021-2022)
 Tik-Tok Indonesia Awards (2022)
 Indonesia's Got Talent Season 3 (2022)
 The Indonesian Next Big Stars - 2022 (Guest Mentor)
 Indonesian Idol Season 12 (2022 - 2023)

TV shows 
 Opening Ceremony –  Pekan Olahraga Nasional (PON) XVIII (2012)
 A Night To Remember (Trans TV) (2016)
 Closing Ceremony –  Pekan Olahraga Nasional (PON) XIX (2016)
 Opening Ceremony – Asian Games 2018

Live Streaming shows 
 BISIK (Bincang Musik) Bersama Rossa (2020 - 2022)
 Rossa's Drama Corner (Viu Indonesia) (2020 - 2021)

Brand ambassador 
 Lulur Mandi Sumber Ayu (2005)
 Sabun Daun Sirih Sumber Ayu (2006)
 Shampoo Zinc (2007)
 Ruzelle Coffee (2008)
 Shampoo Pantene Indonesia (2011 – 2016)
 Handphone Nexian Hikmah (2011)
 KFC Indonesia (2011–2012)
 Dompet Dhuafa (2011–2014)
 Kintakun Spring Bed (2012–2013)
 Oriflame Indonesia (2013 – 2019)
 Indonesian Breast Cancer Foundation
 Brand Ambassador "YKPI Pita Pink" (2015 – 2019)
 Indonesian Anti-Drugs Brand Ambassador (2015 – Now)
 International Brand Ambassador "Wonderful Indonesia" (2015 – Now)
 Kiara Hospital (2016 – Now)
 Alia Go Travel (2017 – Now)
 Hartadinata Abadi Jewellery (2018 – 2020)
 Ministry of Environment and Forest Republic of Indonesia (2018 – Now)
 V-Live Indonesia (2019 – 2021)
 Likee Indonesia (2020)
 Sasa Duta Santan (2021)
 Uniqlo Indonesia (2021)
 Duta Sahabat Desa SDGs, Sumedang, Jawa Barat (2021-Now)
 Ximivogue Indonesia (2021)
 Scarlett Whitening (2022)
 Bodrex Indonesia (2022)

Business 
 House of Rossa
 Diva Family Karaoke (48 Outlet)
 Villa Paya-Paya, Bali (one of the best villa in the world)
 Kain Made in Indonesia
 Paloma
 Rossa Eau De Parfum (Indonesia & Malaysia)
 Rossa Beauty
 Minang Mande Cake (4 outlet)
 Every Ware Store
 Minime Kidz
 Eyelash Rossa X Bubah
 Drumstairs (Halal Korean Food)

Educations 
 Kindergarten: TK Bhakti Pertiwi, Sumedang (1982-1984)
 Elementary School: SDN 1 Sumedang (1984-1990)
 Junior High School: SMPN 1 Sumedang (1990-1993)
 Senior High School: SMAN 1 Sumedang (1993-1996)
 University:  University of Indonesia - Faculty of Social and Political Science (1996-2000)

Honours

Honours of Malaysia
  :
  Knight Companion of the Order of the Crown of Pahang (D.I.M.P) – Dato' (2013)
  Grand Knight of the Order of Sultan Ahmad Shah of Pahang (S.S.A.P) – Dato' Sri (2018)

List of Awards 

 rossaofficial.com

References

External links 

 
 
 Rossa discography on iTunes
 Rossa discography on Discogs

1978 births
Anugerah Musik Indonesia winners
English-language singers from Indonesia
20th-century Indonesian women singers
Indonesian pop singers
Indonesian people of Malay descent
Saudi Arabian people of Malay descent
Moroccan people of Malay descent
Living people
Musicians from West Java
People from Sumedang
Sundanese people
University of Indonesia alumni
21st-century Indonesian women singers
Indonesian actresses
Indonesian film actresses
Indonesian television actresses
Universal Music Group artists